Mencui is a village in the municipality Soriguera, located in the comarca of Pallars Sobirà, in Catalonia, Spain. It lies at an altitude of 1.256 m. Six women and three men were officially reported as inhabitants as of January 2007.

Demographic Data

Sources

External links
 official Website of Soriguera

Populated places in Pallars Sobirà
Towns in Spain